AERS may refer to:
Advanced Economic Research Systems
Alaska Educational Radio System, a broadcaster in Alaska
All Electricity from Renewable Sources projects, including The Climate Reality Project 
Applied Energy Recovery Systems
Applied Educational Research Scheme, a programme funded by the Scottish Executive Education Department and the Scottish Higher Education Funding Council
Atlantic Estuarine Research Society
Adverse Event Reporting System